Gaius Claudius Pulcher was a Roman Republic consul in 92 BC, together with Marcus Perperna. His great-grandfather was Gaius Claudius Pulcher in 177 BC.

In 100 BC, he was one of those took up arms against Saturninus. In 99 BC, he was curule aedile, and in the games celebrated by him elephants were for the first time exhibited in the circus, and painting employed in the scenic decorations. In 95 BC, he was praetor in Sicily, and, by direction of the senate, gave laws to the Halesini respecting the appointment of their senate. The Mamertines made him their patronus. He was consul in 92 BC. Cicero speaks of him as a man possessed of great power and some ability as an orator.

References 
 

2nd-century BC births
1st-century BC Roman consuls
Roman Republican praetors
Roman governors of Sicily
Claudii Pulchri